Zbiersk  is a village in the administrative district of Gmina Stawiszyn, within Kalisz County, Greater Poland Voivodeship, in west-central Poland.

Although higher temperatures were recorded in Poland that day, at the time they were in German territory, so Zbiersk had recorded what was then the highest temperature in Poland.

References

Villages in Kalisz County